Kate Rooney (born Kate Dennison, 7 May 1984) is an English pole vaulter. She is a former British record holder both indoors and out, before both of her records were surpassed by Holly Bleasdale in 2011.

Born in Durban, South Africa, Rooney came from a sporting family and moved to Alsager, England, when she was four years old. She first became interested in athletics through gymnastics. Rooney was selected to compete at national and international levels, finishing fourth in the British Championships, but did not feel passionate about the sport and changed to pole vault in 2000. She became the first British junior athlete to jump 4.00 meters, as she finished seventh at the 2002 World Junior Championships in Kingston, Jamaica.

She competed at the 2006 Commonwealth Games and was the top English performer, finishing seventh overall. Rooney completed a degree in psychology at Staffordshire University and turned professional, committing herself full-time to the sport. Following graduation, she moved to be trained by Steven Rippon at the center of excellence in Loughborough.

Rooney won two outdoor tournaments and five indoor titles in the 2007 athletics season. She competed at her first Olympic Games at Beijing 2008 and was knocked out in seventh place in the second heats but set a new outdoor personal best of 4.40 m. Following this she had surgery on both her Achilles, but this did not affect her form in the next season – she broke the national indoor record, beating Janine Whitlock's seven-year-old record, with a jump of 4.45 m at the 2009 UK Indoor Championships in Sheffield, and bettered that mark by another centimeter at the Birmingham Games a week later.

Following a successful indoor season, Rooney broke the British record in June with a vault of 4.51 m at the Memorial Josefa Odlozila meeting in Prague. Despite the achievement she felt confident of further improvement, setting her eyes on a place in the final at the Berlin World Championships. Another personal best of 4.55 m brought her fourth place in the European Team Championships 2009. After a win at the UK national championships with 4.57 m, she noted the difficulty of the competition she faced in Berlin: several athletes from Germany, Poland, and Russia, including reigning champion Yelena Isinbayeva, were in the running for a medal.

She recorded 4.55 m in the World Championships final, finishing in sixth place overall. A 4.60 m clearance for third place at the Pedros Cup brought an end to a successful season for the Briton, which had seen her beat the national record nine times over the course of eight months.

At the 2010 Commonwealth Games in New Delhi, Rooney won a bronze medal in the women's pole vault.

Since retiring, Rooney has worked in schools and encouraged children's involvement in sport, whilst beginning a further career path in financial services and advice.

Personal bests
Rooney is the British record holder in pole vault indoors, and she previously held the outdoor record. She beat Janine Whitlock's 4.47 m outdoor record in June 2009. She broke the British record nine times in 2009. Her own outdoor record of 4.60m was beaten by Holly Bleasdale in June 2011, with a jump of 4.70m.

All information taken from IAAF Profile.

References

External links

Profile from Loughborough University

1984 births
Living people
English female pole vaulters
British female pole vaulters
Olympic female pole vaulters
Olympic athletes of Great Britain
Athletes (track and field) at the 2008 Summer Olympics
Athletes (track and field) at the 2012 Summer Olympics
Commonwealth Games bronze medallists for England
Commonwealth Games medallists in athletics
Athletes (track and field) at the 2006 Commonwealth Games
Athletes (track and field) at the 2010 Commonwealth Games
World Athletics Championships athletes for Great Britain
British Athletics Championships winners
Alumni of Staffordshire University
Medallists at the 2010 Commonwealth Games